The Finnish Heritage Agency, previously known in English as the National Board of Antiquities, preserves Finland's material cultural heritage: collects, studies and distributes knowledge of it. The agency is a cultural and research institution, but it is also a government authority charged with the protection of archaeological sites, built heritage, cultural-historically valuable environments and cultural property, in collaboration with other officials and museums.

The Agency offers a wide range and diversified range of services, a professional staff of specialists, the exhibitions and collections of its several museums, extensive archives, and a specialized scientific library, all of which are at the disposal of the general public.

The Finnish Heritage Agency is attached to the Ministry of Education.

References

External links
 

Heritage Agency
Heritage Agency
Finland, Heritage Agency
Finland, Heritage Agency